Raziya Sultan, also known as Razia Sultan, is 1983 Indian period biographical film, written and directed by Kamal Amrohi, and starring Hema Malini, Parveen Babi and Dharmendra in lead roles. Upon release, it was a box office disaster, mainly due to its high production value. 

N.B. Kulkarni won the Filmfare Award for Best Art Direction, the only win for the film. Khayyam received a Filmfare nomination for Best Music Director. Lyrics were by Jan Nisar Akhtar and two songs picturized on*Dharmendra as Yakut Jamaluddin, Abyssinian slave by Nida Fazli; one song by Kaifi Azmi; both  walked into the project when Akhtar died. Some songs were sung by Lata Mangeshkar, including  "Aye Dil-e Nadaan". Kamal Amrohi movie some scenes shooting  Razia Sultan were shot in Tonk in 1981-82.

Plot 
The film is based on the life of Razia Sultan (1205–1240), the only female Sultan of Delhi (1236–1240) and her speculated love affair with the Abyssinian slave, Jamal-ud-Din Yakut.

Cast 
Hema Malini as Razia Sultan
Dharmendra as Yakut Jamaluddin, Abyssinian slave
Vijayendra Ghatge as Amil Altunia
Parveen Babi as Khakun
Pradeep Kumar as Sultan Altamash
Ajit as Amil Balban
Veena as Empress Shah Turkhan
Sohrab Modi as Vazir-e-Azam
Dolly Jena

Soundtrack 
It was the second time that Khayyam worked for a Kamal Amrohi's film. Earlier he had given music for Shankar Hussain, a movie produced by Amrohi. There is a story as to how Kamal got liking for Khayyam's music. Once Kamal Amrohi and his wife Meena Kumari liked a song that they had listened to on the radio. The song was "Parbaton Ke Pedon Par" and was sung by Mohammed Rafi and Suman Kalyanpur. Later on, they learned that this song was composed by Khayyam for a movie called Shagoon (1964). However, by the time Razia Sultan went on the shooting floors, Laxmikant–Pyarelal became the most-sought-after music director duo. So, Kamal Amrohi signed them. But, he did not like one fast-paced tune composed by the duo for the film and told them to compose a new tune instead. When Kamal went to the duo's place to listen to their new tune, he was asked to wait as the music directors were in a meeting. Feeling insulted that he was asked to wait by someone so junior to him, Kamal Amrohi replaced them with Khayyam.

Box office 
Being director Kamal Amrohi’s dream project, it was made in a very grand way. Unfortunately, when released, the film made barely , becoming a box office disaster.

Awards 

 31st Filmfare Awards:

Won

 Best Art Direction – N. B. Kulkarni

Nominated

 Best Music Director – Khayyam

References

Further reading

External links 

1983 films
1980s biographical drama films
1980s Hindi-language films
1983 drama films
Films set in the 13th century
History of India on film
Indian biographical drama films
Indian epic films
Films set in Delhi
Films about women in India
Films scored by Khayyam
Historical epic films
Indian historical drama films
1980s historical drama films
1980s Urdu-language films
Cultural depictions of Razia Sultan
Films directed by Kamal Amrohi
Urdu-language Indian films